Punam Patel is an American actress. She is best known for her roles in the sitcom Kevin from Work (2015) and the television series Special (2019), the latter of which earned her a Primetime Emmy Award nomination.

Early life
Patel grew up in Vero Beach, Florida.

Career
Patel was nominated for a 2019 Primetime Emmy Award for Outstanding Actress in a Short Form Comedy or Drama Series for her role as Kim Laghari on Special.

In 2021, Patel joined the Showtime comedy pilot I Love That for You.

Filmography

Film

Television

References

External links

American television actresses
American actresses of Indian descent
Living people
Year of birth missing (living people)
21st-century American women